Phyllanthus microcladus is a plant found in sub tropical areas of eastern Australia. The brush sauropus is listed as endangered by extinction. It occurs by streams in sub tropical rainforest, from as far south as Grafton, New South Wales to the south east rainforest areas of Queensland. Most often seen in the valleys of the Brunswick, Richmond and Tweed Rivers in far north eastern New South Wales.

Former habitat areas have been cleared for agriculture and housing. Populations are small and fragmented, and they are threatened by invasive weeds and by being crushed by domestic animals such as cattle. Stream erosion also threatens their habitat. Male and female flowers grow on different plants.

Description
A small hairless plant, with many small branches, up to 35 cm tall with tiny leaves, 4 to 8 mm long and 2 to 5 mm wide. Leaf stems 1 mm long. The leaf shape is mostly round and somewhat wedge shaped. Leaves glaucous underneath. Flowering occurs in the summer months on relatively long stems. The fruit is a small capsule, around 3 mm long.

References

Flora of New South Wales
Flora of Queensland
microcladus
Endangered plants